A number of diseases/syndromes of the human body may be associated with the development of café au lait macules.

See also 
List of skin conditions
List of allergens
List of cutaneous conditions associated with increased risk of nonmelanoma skin cancer
List of cutaneous conditions associated with internal malignancy
List of cutaneous conditions caused by mutations in keratins
List of cutaneous conditions caused by problems with junctional proteins
List of dental abnormalities associated with cutaneous conditions
List of genes mutated in cutaneous conditions
List of histologic stains that aid in diagnosis of cutaneous conditions
List of immunofluorescence findings for autoimmune bullous conditions
List of inclusion bodies that aid in diagnosis of cutaneous conditions
List of keratins expressed in the human integumentary system
List of radiographic findings associated with cutaneous conditions
List of specialized glands within the human integumentary system
List of target antigens in pemphigoid
List of target antigens in pemphigus

References 

 
 

Cutaneous conditions
Café au lait macules